Morano may refer to:

People
 Albert P. Morano (1908–1987), American politician
 Emma Morano (1899–2017), Italian supercentenarian
 Jacinto Morano (born 1984), Spanish lawyer and politician
 Juan Morano (1941–2018), Spanish politician
 Maddalena Caterina Morano (1847–1908), Italian beatified Roman Catholic nun
 Marc Morano (born 1968), American climate change skeptic and journalist
 Michael L. Morano (1915–2000), American politician
 Nadine Morano (born 1963), French politician
 Pellegrino Morano (born 1877), American mobster
 Reed Morano (born 1977), American cinematographer and director
 Sue Morano (born 1960), American politician

Places 
 Morano sul Po, a place in Alessandria, Italy
 Morano Calabro, a place in Cosenza, Italy

Other uses 
 Morano (publishing house)
 Marrano, a Jew of the Iberian peninsula who maintained a private religious identity behind a façade of Catholicism

Italian-language surnames